Vishvaksena or Vishwaksena, is the commander-in-chief of the army of the Hindu deity Vishnu, additionally serving as a gatekeeper and chamberlain of his celestial abode of Vaikuntha. As the embodiment of the tantras, Vishvaksena is worshipped before any ritual or function in the Vaikhanasas and Sri Vaishnavism sects. He occupies an important place in Vaikhanasa and Pancaratra temple traditions, where temple festivals often begin with his worship and procession.

Iconography and associations

The Kurma Purana describes Vishvaksena to have born out of a portion of Vishnu, carrying a conch (shankha), Sudarshana Chakra (discus) and gada (mace) and wearing yellow clothes like his master. The Kalika Purana describes him as an attendant of Vishnu, who has four arms, and is red and brown in complexion. He seats on a white lotus, has long beard and wears matted hair. He carries a lotus, gada, shanka, and chakra in his hands. 

The Pancharatra text Lakshmi Tantra mentions Vishvaksena as four-armed and holding a shankha and a lotus. In another instance, he is said to carry a sword and a club, wear yellow clothes and have tawny eyes, beard and eyebrows, and four teeth. In a hymn, the remark is that Vishvaksena carries all attributes of Vishnu, including the srivatsa mark and his weapons. The Vishvaksena icon of the Tirumala Venkateswara Temple has four hands and carries a conch (shankha) Sudarshana chakra (discus) in his upper hands and his lower hands are on thigh (Gada hasta) and in Avgana hasta.

Literature 

The Brihad Bhagavatamrita describes Vishvaksena in service to Vishnu at Vaikuntha:

The Garga Samhita states that Vishvaksena guards the northern gate of Vaikuntha day and night.

In one of the Puranas, it is mentioned that Sugriva, the chief of The vanara army that helped Rama (who was an incarnation of Vishnu) in Treta Yuga was the avatar of Vishvaksena.

Vishvaksena does not appear in Vedas or the Dharma Shastra texts, but his worship is mentioned in Pancharatra and other Agama texts. Vishvaksena is believed to symbolize the sacred Agama scriptures.

The twelve Alvar saints of Sri Vaishnavism sect are considered as manifestations of Vishnu in some form, and the Alvar saint Nammalvar is considered as an avatar of Vishvaksena. The poet Bhattar, in his Srirangaraja Stava, has taniyans, or verses, praising various acharyas (teachers). Vishvaksena also has a taniyan dedicated to him in the later part of the work, incorporating him in the list of the traditional Sri Vaishnava guru parampara (succession of teachers and disciples) starting from Vishnu's consort Lakshmi (Sri) to Nammalvar. This indicates the influence of Pancharatra texts on Sri Vaishnavism.

Legends

In one myth, Vishvaksena, the son of Varuna, prayed to Venkateshvara at Tirumala in order to become blessed with the title of the commander of his forces.

The Kurma Purana speaks of a visit of the god Shiva in the form of a cursed mendicant or beggar (Bhikshatana, a form of Bhairava) to Vaikuntha. The Vaikuntha gate was guarded by Vishvaksena, who did not recognise Shiva and did not allow him to enter. Bhairava ordered his terrible attendant Kalavega to fight with Vishvaksena. However, Kalavega was defeated by Vishvaksena. As Vishvaksena charged towards Bhairava, Bhairava himself slew Vishvaksena with his trishula and impaled his corpse upon it. This form of Bhairava is known as Kankala or Kankalamurti ("One with the skeleton").

Worship
Vishvaksena occupies an important place in the Vaikhanasa sect of Vaishnavism, a sect dedicated to Vishnu. Any ritual or function begins with the worship of Vishvaksena. As the commander-in-chief of Vishnu's army, he is believed to protect the ritual or function from obstacles and evil. This role is similar to that of Ganesha, who generally is the first worshipped god in Hinduism, especially the Shaiva (dedicated to the god Shiva) tradition.

In Sri Vaishnavism, he is described as the "dispeller of difficulties" and the bearer of a moon-like shining complexion. Ramanuja remarks that the Vaishnavas worship Vishvaksena in the place of Kartikeya and Ganesha.

In the taniyan (hymn), Bhattar invokes Vishvaksena as one who facilities the life of Vishnu and Lakshmi and controls all creations by gesture of his hands to cause chit (conscious) and achit (not conscious) to execute their duty. In another hymn, Bhattar seeks happiness by appealing to Vishvaksena and his consort Sutravati.

Mantra and mudra
The Lakshmi Tantra prescribe the worship of Vishvaksena and mention his mantra om rhum vaum jnanadaya namah. The devotee should mediate upon Vishvaksena in the north direction. Before making an offering of rice to Vishnu, Vishvaksena is prescribed to be worshipped with his mantra, portion of the rice offering and oblations. Apart from invoking Vishvaksena to the rites, he is also offered by the Chief Priest by reciting the anga mantras (anga means "body" and "mantra" is hymns") with hasta mudras (hand gestures). Vishvaksena anga-mantras recited at the beginning of rites is as below.

"Om rhyram hrdayaya namaha (we salute your heart)
Om rhyrim sirasa svaha (salutation to the head)
Om rhrum sikhayai vausat (decorate the hairstyle)
Om rhraim havekcaya hum (decorate the hairstyle)
Om rhraum netraya vausat (decorate the eyes)
Om hrah astray phat.(decorate with armaments)"

The mudra for Vishvaksena mantra, which will enable a person to be free of all human bondage, is the following form. Three fingers of the left hand including the little finger are folded into the left palm itself, the index finger is held backwards away from the thumb. On the right hand three fingers, as in the case of the left hand, are folded into the palm. Then the hand is placed on the side of the nostril. The index finger is then doubled and placed on top of the thumb. The right hand is then raised up to show the mudra of throwing a disc. With this mudra, it is stated that a person can achieve freedom from the human bondage.

Temple rituals
At Tirumala Venkateswara Temple (which follows Vaikhanasa tradition), Vishvaksena is worshipped before any temple ritual. The temple for Vishvaksena is located at the northern side of the main temple, in the Mukkoti Pradakshinam ('Pradakshinam' means: clockwise circumambulation). Offerings of flowers and garlands (nirmalya) to the central icon of Venkateswara (an aspect of Vishnu) are removed from it and then offered to the Vishvaksena icon. The temple festival Brahmotsavam commences with the worship of Vishvaksena and his bronze icon is taken in procession around the temple precincts. Vishvaksena is believed to arrange for the festival and ensure that it goes on smoothly.

The ritual of offering of remnants of puja offerings to the central or festival icon of Vishnu to Vishvaksena, before closing of the temple doors, is embedded in Pancharatra tradition. The poet Kuresha remarks that Vishvaksena sustains on the remnants of his master's food, which is a sign of approval of his master.

The Srirangam temple, dedicated to Ranganatha (an aspect of Vishnu), also celebrates similar festivals where Vishvaksena plays a role in the temple festivals. On the first day of the festival, images of Vishvaksena and Hanuman are paraded to the shrine of Ranganayaki, the presiding consort goddess of the temple. Soil from a holy bael tree and from the banks of the Kaveri river are brought by priests, as though collected by the deities and seeds are sown in this soil as part of the Ankurarpanam (sprouting the seeds) ritual. Then as part of the Nagarasodani, Vishvaksena is paraded again as though inspecting the streets before the commencement of the main procession of the central deity of the temple.

The temple festival Brahmotsavam of Varadharaja Perumal Temple, Kanchipuram also begins with worship and procession of the god on the day before the main days of Brahmostavam, which is known as Sena Mudaliar.

References

Bibliography
 

Hindu gods
Tutelary deities
Forms of Vishnu